Provincial Trunk Highway 75 (PTH 75, also officially known as the Lord Selkirk Highway) is a major highway in the Canadian province of Manitoba. It is the main link between the city of Winnipeg and the United States border, where it connects with Interstate 29/U.S. Route 81 (I-29/US 81).

Route description
The highway, which is part of Canada's National Highway System, begins at the Pembina-Emerson Border Crossing and runs approximately 101 kilometres (63 miles) north, along on the west side of the Red River, to Winnipeg where it connects with Pembina Highway (Winnipeg Route 42). The northern end of PTH 75 is its junction with Winnipeg's Perimeter Highway, which is part of the Trans-Canada Highway system. PTH 75 is also part of an International Mid-Continent Trade Corridor, a network of highways and rail lines that connects cities in central regions of North America.

The entire route is a four-lane divided highway, but access is not fully controlled. Proposals exist to upgrade the highway to an expressway or freeway standard, with bypasses at the town of Morris and Winnipeg neighbourhood of St. Norbert.

Speed limits 
The remainder of the highway continues to have a speed limit of  except in urban areas.

U.S. border to St. Jean Baptiste: 
Morris: 
Remainder of highway:

History
The PTH 75 route originated as the Pembina Trail, which was used to travel between the Selkirk Settlement and Fort Pembina during the 19th century. The provincial government commemorated this by designating the road as the Lord Selkirk Highway in 1962. By the early 20th century, the trail evolved into the Canadian leg of the Jefferson Highway leading from Winnipeg to New Orleans.

The highway was originally designated as PTH 14 when Manitoba introduced the highway numbering system in 1920. It was re-numbered to PTH 75 in 1949 as, at the time, it connected with US 75 at the Noyes–Emerson East Border Crossing and it was common practice for Manitoba to match highway numbers with connecting U.S. routes. Further changes occurred in the 1950s when a more direct route was constructed in the Rural Municipality of Ritchot and bypasses were added around the communities of Ste. Agathe and St. Jean Baptiste.

PTH 75 was gradually converted to a divided four-lane highway between 1985 and 1994 except within the Town of Morris and a  section between the Emerson East border station and (former) PTH 29 junction near the West Lynne (now Emerson) border station. The closure of the Noyes and Emerson East border stations (Canada in 2003; the U.S. in 2006) relegated PTH 75's southern terminus a dead-end at the border; thus, PTH 75 was re-routed to its present southern terminus (superseding PTH 29) in 2012.  Most of the short decommissioned section of PTH 75 was added to Provincial Road 200.  Motorists now wishing to travel US 75 are required to detour through Pembina, North Dakota via I-29, North Dakota Highway 59, and Minnesota State Highway 171.

In 2020, the Canadian and Manitoba governments completed reconstruction of PTH 75's approach to the Emerson border crossing to accommodate future expansion at the port of entry.  This included the removal of the old PTH 75/PR 200 (former PTH 29/75) intersection near the border and extending PR 200 to its new southern terminus further away from the border. The Manitoba government also has future plans to reroute PTH 75 around the Winnipeg neighborhood of St. Norbert and connect it to Winnipeg Route 90 (Kenaston Boulevard).

Flooding issues
PTH 75's proximity to the flood-prone Red River causes closures of the highway during spring flooding. The town of Morris is one of the most problematic areas, as the town is forced to close off the dikes surrounding the town, thereby cutting off PTH 75. These closures have a significant impact on the trucking industry, as PTH 75 is the primary transportation route between Winnipeg and the United States. The Manitoba Trucking Association estimates the closing of the highway costs the industry $1.5 million CAD per week. The closures also have a significant impact on Morris businesses that depend on travelers passing through town. Several solutions have been considered to fix the ongoing problem, including the building of new bridges and raising of roadways along PTH 75. In June 2020, the Manitoba government unveiled a plan to upgrade a portion of PR 246 to utilize it as a bypass when the dike at the north end of Morris is closed.

Major intersections
This is the travel route for Provincial Trunk Highway 75 (PTH 75) from south to north:

See also
Red River Trails

References

External links

075
Manitoba Highway 075
Emerson, Manitoba